Musée Visionnaire is a private museum dedicated to outsider art located in Predigerplatz 10, 8001 Zurich, Switzerland.  It was founded on 18 November 2013. The Musée Visionnaire is a non-profit association.

It is an art foyer where changing exhibitions allow visitors to discover and re-discover contemporary Art Brut | Outsider Art and experience it within the context of related art forms. Special social events are dedicated to topical subjects touching upon the world of art and current public issues.

Notes and references

See also 
 American Visionary Art Museum
 Collection de l'art brut

Museums in Zürich
Outsider art
Art museums and galleries in Switzerland